Chesnokovka may refer to:
Chesnokovka, name of the town of Novoaltaysk, Altai Krai, Russia, before 1962
Chesnokovka, Republic of Bashkortostan, a village (selo) in the Republic of Bashkortostan, Russia
Chesnokovka, Orenburg Oblast, a village (selo) in Orenburg Oblast, Russia